Harold Grinspoon (born 1929) is an American real estate developer and philanthropist. He is the founder of Aspen Square Management, but is perhaps even more widely known for his philanthropic flagship PJ Library, that together with worldwide partners, presents over 860,000 free books each month to children across 27 countries, in seven languages. PJ Library is just one program within the Harold Grinspoon Foundation, created by Grinspoon and his wife Diane Troderman in 1991 with a mission to use Grinspoon’s considerable wealth to enhance Jewish and community life in Western Massachusetts and around the world. In 2015, Grinspoon and Troderman signed The Giving Pledge, and joined a growing list of leading philanthropists who have made a commitment to dedicate at least 50% of their wealth to philanthropy.

Early life
Grinspoon grew up in the Auburndale section of Newton, Massachusetts. He is the son of Simon Grinspoon and Sally Rose, first and second-generation Jewish immigrants from Russia. He is the younger brother of Lester Grinspoon, a psychiatrist and prominent professor at Harvard Medical School.
 
After Grinspoon graduated high school, he attended Marlboro College in Vermont, though he never graduated. To pay for tuition, he spent his summers working on an ice cream truck. His first entrepreneurial pursuit was at Marlboro; he purchased a used Maytag washer, and operated a coin-operated laundry machine in the basement of the college. He left Marlboro after 2 ½ years at the age of 21 to manage a fleet of ice cream trucks for Howard Johnson's, but was soon drafted into active duty in the Navy.

Real Estate Business

In 1959, Grinspoon purchased his first two-family rental property in Agawam, Massachusetts. Subsequently, he founded the business that would one day become Aspen Square Management, currently one of the top 50 privately held national real estate firms. As the business grew, Grinspoon brought in more partners. Aspen Square Management is now made up of more than 15,000 rental apartments across 16 states.

Philanthropy
At age 59, Grinspoon was diagnosed with cancer of the tongue. It was at this point in his life Grinspoon came to realize that creating wealth alone was not enough, and he vowed to find a higher purpose.
 
Not long after, in 1991, he and his wife created the Harold Grinspoon Foundation. The HGF began as a small foundation focused on the local Jewish community in western Massachusetts. PJ Library, however, soon emerged as a program with a life of its own. Modeled after Dolly Parton’s “Imagination Library,” but with a Jewish focus, PJ Library is designed to engage parents with their children each night at bedtime with a free book that illustrates various aspects of Jewish traditions and history. The books are distributed predominantly monthly. PJ Library reaches children in North America and around the world through its partnerships, including 190,000 books in Arabic to children in Israel in partnership with the Ministry of Education.
 
The foundation’s many other programs include funding and professional development for non-profit Jewish summer camps through “J-Camp 180,” and tuition incentive grants for families with children attending participating local schools. Through HGF’s "Life & Legacy" program that encourages future giving in wills and estate planning, Jewish communities around the country have raised a billion dollars to date. Meanwhile, Grinspoon’s Charitable Foundation focuses on supporting and acknowledging outstanding teachers, helping farmers with capital improvements,  and encouraging entrepreneurship, as well as promoting energy conservation by educating families in Western MA about how they can decrease their energy bills by making their homes much more efficient in energy consumption. The HGF continues to grow and expand under the leadership of its President, Grinspoon’s daughter in law, Winnie Sandler Grinspoon.

Artwork
In his mid 80s, Grinspoon began a third career as an artist. The inspiration came to him by accident, when a large cherry tree fell in his backyard in Longmeadow, Massachusetts. Moved by its form and shape, instead of having it taken away, he decided to make it into something lasting and beautiful. The result was a 25-foot outdoor sculpture. In the years since, he has created over a hundred sculptures, many installed in public spaces across Massachusetts and nationally.

References

Living people
1929 births
Jewish American philanthropists
Giving Pledgers
21st-century philanthropists
American real estate businesspeople
21st-century American Jews